is a Japanese visual artist working primarily with installation art and experimental photography currently based in the United States. He is most known for his Sungazing, Afterimage Requiem, and Burning Away series.

Themes and inspiration 
Ito’s work addresses issues of deep intergenerational loss and connections as he explores the materiality and experimental processes of photography, visualizing the invisible: radiation, memory and life/death.

Ito’s work, fundamentally rooted in the trauma and legacy passed down from his late grandfather - a survivor of the atomic bombing of Hiroshima, meditates on the complexity of his identity and heritage through examining the past and current threats of nuclear disaster and his present status as an US-immigrant.

Many of Ito’s artworks transformed both art and non-art spaces into temporal monuments that became platforms for the audience to explore social issues and the memorials dedicated to the losses suffered from the consequences of those issues.

Exhibitions 
Ito has shown in over 60 exhibitions worldwide. Among those are solo exhibitions at prominent spaces such as Southeastern Center for Contemporary Art Museum, Winston-Salem, NC; Masur Museum of Art, Monroe, LA; IA&A at Hillyer (Hillyer Art Space), DC;  and Manifest Gallery, Cincinnati, OH. Group exhibitions of note include: the Norton Museum of Art, West Palm Beach, FL; Ethan Cohen KuBe, NY; the Walters Museum of Art, Baltimore, MD; Museum of Contemporary Photography, Chicago, IL; California Institute of Integral Studies, San Francisco, CA; and PH21 Gallery in Budapest, Hungary.

2023

 The Beginning, In the Land Around Me, Gregory Allicar Museum/Center for Fine Art Photography, CO

2022

 Teach Me How to Love This World, Stamp Gallery at University of Maryland College Park
 The High Wall 2022, Inscape Arts, Washington
 The Heart Isn’t Heart-Shaped, Longwood Center for the Visual Arts, VA

2021

 Aborning New Light, Center for Fine Art Photography, Denver, CO
 Recovery to Normal Existence, The Halide Project, PA
 Our Looming Ground Zero, Creative Alliance, MD
 OD Photo Prize 2021, Open Door Gallery, London, UK
 This Place is a Message, ArtYard Contemporary Art Center, NJ
 Unbound 10!, Candela Gallery, Richmond, VA

2020

 Atomic Sentence, Harmony Hall Regional Center, DC
 Darkest Before Dawn: Art in A Time of Uncertainty, Ethan Cohen KuBe, NY
 Elongated Shadows, Apexart, NY
 What Does Democracy Look Like? Museum of Contemporary Photography, IL
 New Talents: 2020, PEP(Photographic Exploration Project), Berlin

2019

 Archives Aflame, Southeastern Center for Contemporary Art, NC
 Out of the Box: Camera-less Photography, The Norton Museum of Art, FL
 Ghostly Traces: Memory and Mortality in Contemporary Photography, Vicki Myhren Gallery at University of Denver, CO
Dear Leader, Candela Gallery, Richmond, VA

2018

InLight Richmond, Virginia Museum of Fine Arts, 1708 Gallery, VA
Fotofocus Biennial 2018: Nuclear Fallout, Antioch College, OH
The Noorderlicht Summer: Opera Spanga Aida, Noorderlicht: House of Photography, Netherland
What Keeps You Up at Night, Mendocino College Art Gallery, Ukiah, CA
Afterimage Requiem, Baltimore War Memorial, MD
Only What We Can Carry, IA&A at Hillyer (Hillyer Art Space), DC
Infertile American Dream, 14x48 Art Billboard, 215 Woodpoint Rd, Brooklyn
Atomic Traces, Online sponsored by 14x48.org Art Billboard

2017

 Re:Collection, Museum of Contemporary Photography at Columbia College, Chicago, IL
 3rd International Exhibition on Conceptual Art, CICA Museum, South Korea
 54th Annual Group Exhibition, Masur Museum of Art, LA
 Wave Pool 44th Group Exhibition, Field Projects Chelsea Gallery, NY

Residencies 
2023

 Santa Fe Art Institute, NM: Changing Climate Residency

2022

 FAR & Away Remote AIR at Florida State University

2021

 MASS MoCA Studio Artist in Residency, MA
 Denis Roussel Fellowship at the Center for Fine Art Photography, CO

2020

 Marva and John Warnock Biennial AIR, University of Utah, UT

2019

 The Center for Photography at Woodstock (CPW) Artist in Residency, NY

Awards 
2022

 CPA Artist Grants, Center for Photographic Art, CA
 ACP Equity Scholarship, Atlanta Celebrates Photography, GA
 Baker Artist Award (Multi-disciplinary) Finalist, GCBA, MA

2021

 OD Photo Prize - Judges’ Picks Award, Open Door Gallery, UK
 The Candela Collection Acquisition Award, Candela Gallery, VA
 The Critical Mass 2021 TOP 50, PhotoLucida, OR
 Contemporary Art Purchasing Program, University of Maryland: Stamp Gallery, MD
 FCA Emergency Project Grant, Foundation for Contemporary Arts, NY
 Denis Roussel Fellowship, The Center for Fine Art Photography, CO

2020

 The Marva and John Warnock Biennial Award, University of Utah, UT

2019

 Artist in Residence at Center for Photography at Woodstock
 Semifinalist for the 14th Janet & Walter Sondheim Prize, Baltimore, MD
 Artist in Residence at Creative Alliance, Baltimore, MD

2018

 Individual Artist Award: Photography, Maryland Arts State Council, MD
Artist in Residence at Creative Alliance, Baltimore, MD

2017
 Working Artist Photography Award/Grant, Working Artist Org, WA
Honorable Mention for INFOCUS Sidney Zuber Photography Award, Phoenix Art Museum, AZ
 Maryland representative Artist for The States Project, Lenscratch

2016
 7th Manifest One Award, Manifest Gallery, Cincinnati, OH
 Rubys Artist Project Grants: Full grant recipient, GBCA
 Honorable Mention for IPA: International Photography Awards
 4th Annual New York Times Portfolio Review recipient
 Shortlisted for Royal Photography Society Annual print exhibition, UK
 Snider Prize honorable mention
 Awards for Innovations in Imaging awarded by Society of Photographic Education
 Shortlisted for Royal Photographic Society Annual print exhibition, UK
 Shortlisted for Tokyo International Foto Awards
 Honorable Mention Award at 53rd Annual Juried Exhibition at Masur Museum, Monroe, Louisiana

Publications 

BmoreArt, Building Blocks of Narratives: New Solo Exhibits by Kei Ito and R.L. Tillman by Fanni Somogyi
Hyperallergic, Kei Ito Traces Tragedy and Mourning by Dereck Stafford Mangus
Strange Fire Collective, Q&A: THE HIGH WALL: KEI ITO By Jesse Egner and Kelly Lee Webeck 
Silver Eye Center for Photography, 2022 Silver List by The Black List
PhotoLucida, 2022 Critical Mass Top 50 Photographers 
Catalyst Contemporary 2021 Catalog
It’s Nice That, Kei Ito builds an exhibition space around his grandfather’s survival of Hiroshima by  Dalia Al-Dujaili
Postdigital Science and Education, Simple, Dark, and Deep: Photographic Theorizations of As-Yet Schools by Sarah Pfohl
Denverite, On the anniversary of the first nuclear test, an artist and third-generation Hiroshima victim imagines a nuclear-free world by Maggie Donahue
Candela Gallery, Photography is Dead, Long Live Photography Exhibition Catalog
BmoreArt, Art and: Kei Ito - Ito’s work tells how people were affected by nuclear warfare, and how we could be affected again by Suzy Kopf
e-flux, Elongated Shadows by apexart
apexart - Elongated Shadows by Liz Faust 
Hyperallergic, Review: In the Shadow of the Atomic Bomb, Artists Respond by Ilana Novick
Strange Fire Collective, In This Body of Mine at Milwaukee Institute of Art & Design 
Studio Magazine (University of Utah), 2020 Warnock AIR Interview: All That Can Happen In a Single Breath by Marina Gomberg, 2020, printed
Washington City Paper, The Best Photo Exhibits of 2018 by Louis Jacobson
 Exposure Magazine/Medium, Art of the Atomic Legacy: the Work of Kei Ito
BBC World News and BBC Culture/Art interviewed about Afterimage Requiem exhibition.
Washington Post Magazine published an article about the project Afterimage Requiem
 The Baltimore Sun Newspaper featured the project Afterimage Requiem on the front article
Washington Post reviewed the solo exhibition at Hillyer Art Space in DC
 Strange Fire Collective Q&A: KEI ITO
 Velocity Magazine Making Meaning of the Atomic Bomb
 Art Maze Magazine International Issue 3: Summer, 2 page spread
 Featured on the Chicago Magazine The 5 Biggest Buys by Chicago Art Museum in 2016

Collections 
Eskenazi Museum of Art
Gregory Allicar Museum of Art
Norton Museum of Art
Museum of Contemporary Photography in Chicago
Center for Photography at Woodstock
Candela Collection 
Stamp Gallery at University of Maryland
 Rochester Institute of Technology
 Maryland Institute College of Art
En Foco
 Chroma / California Institute of Integral Studies

Art Fairs 

 2021 Art Miami

Education 
 Masters of Fine Arts in Photographic and Electronic Media from the Maryland Institute College of Art, 2016
 Bachelors of Arts in Fine Art Photography from Rochester Institute of Technology, 2014

References

Living people
Japanese photographers
21st-century Japanese artists
Fine art photographers
Japanese contemporary artists
1991 births